

Europe 
Andalusians: St. John of Ávila, Virgin of Hope of Macarena.
Austrians: St. Leopold the Good, Saint Joseph.
Basques: St. Ignatius of Loyola.
Bosnians: St. Elijah.
Bulgarians: St. John of Rila.
Canarians: Our Lady of Candelaria, St. Peter of Saint Joseph de Betancur.
Catalans: St. George.
Cornish: St. Piran, St Petroc.
Croats: St. Joseph.
Czechs: St. Wenceslas.  
Danes: St. Canute.
Dutch: St. Willibrord.
English: St. George; Our Lady of Walsingham; Edward the Confessor; Edward the Martyr; Michael the Archangel.
Finns: St. Henry bishop of Finland.
French: St. Joan of Arc; St. Denis, St. Martin of Tours.
Flemings: Saint Walpurga.
Gaels: St Columba.
Galicians: St. James the Great.
Germans: Archangel Michael.
Greeks: St. Nicholas.
Greek Cypriots: Barnabas, and Lazarus of Bethany.
Hungarians: St. Stephen of Hungary.
Irish: St. Patrick, St Bridget.
Italians: St. Francis of Assisi and St. Catherine of Siena.
Lithuanians: St. Casimir.
Macedonians: St. Clement of Ohrid.
Maltese: St. Paul.
Manx: St. Maughold.
Monégasques: St. Devota.
Norwegians: St. Olaf.
Poles: St. Stanislaus Kostka.
Portuguese: St. Anthony of Padua, Our Lady of Fatima.
Romanians: St. Andrew.
Romani people: Saint Sarah, Blessed Ceferino Giménez Malla. 
Russians: St. Andrew,  St. Nicholas. 
Scots: St. Andrew. St. Margaret, St. Columba
Serbs: St. Sava, Stefan Nemanja. 
Sicilians: Agatha of Sicily, Saint Rosalia.
Spaniards: St. James the Great.
Spanish Gypsies: Virgin of Hope of Macarena, Blessed Ceferino Giménez Malla.
Swedes: St. Bridget.
Ukrainians: Vladimir the Great.
Walloons: Saint Michael the Archangel.  
Welsh: St. David.

Africa 
Amharas: St. George.
Berbers: St. Cyprian.
Copts: St. Mark.
Kongo people: St. Anthony of Padua.
Maghrebis: St. Cyprian.
Malagasy people: Vincent de Paul.

Asia 
Arabs: St. Sergius and Bacchus.  
Armenians: St. Gregory the Illuminator.
Assyrians: St. Ephrem the Syrian, St. Zayya, Saint Mari, Addai of Edessa.
Bicolanos: Our Lady of Peñafrancia.
Chinese Christians: Saint Joseph.
Chinese Filipinos: St. Lorenzo Ruiz.
Druze people: Jethro, Elijah or St. George (identified as Al-Khidr). 
Georgians: St. George.
Goan Catholics: Francis Xavier.
Japanese Christians: Francis Xavier.
Jewish Christians: James the Just.
Korean Christians: Saint Joseph.
Maronites: St. Maron.
Kapampangans: Virgen de los Remedios de Pampanga.
Lebanese Christians: Saint George.
Lebanese people: St. Charbel Makhlouf, Rafqa Pietra Choboq Ar-Rayès, Nimatullah Kassab.
Palestinian Christians: Saint George.
Pangasinense: Our Lady of Manaoag.
Persian people: Addai of Edessa, Saint Mari.
Singaporean Christians: Francis Xavier.
Syrian Christians: Saint George.
Syrian Christians of Kerala: Saint Thomas the Apostle.
Syriacs/Assyrians/Arameans: Ephrem the Syrian.
Turks: John the Apostle.
Vietnamese Christians: Saint Joseph.

Americas 
Afro-Americans: Saint Benedict the Moor.
 Afro-Caribbeans: Peter Claver.
 Argentines: Our Lady of Luján.
Bolivians: Virgen de Copacabana.
Brazilians: Our Lady of Aparecida.
Chileans: Our Lady of Mount Carmel.
Colombians: Our Lady of the Rosary of Chiquinquirá, Peter Claver.
Costa Ricans: Virgen de los Angeles.
Cubans: Our Lady of Charity. 
Dominicans: Virgin of Altagracia.
Ecuadorians: Mariana de Jesús de Paredes.
Euro-Americans: the Immaculate Conception, (unofficial:) Our Lady of America.
French Canadians: St. John the Baptist.
Guatemalans: Our Lady of the Rosary.
Haitians: Our Lady of Perpetual Help.
Hispanic people and the Hispanic world: Our Lady of the Pillar.
Hondurans: Our Lady of Suyapa.
Indigenous peoples of the Americas: St. Juan Diego.
Mexicans: Our Lady of Guadalupe.
Nicaraguans: Immaculate Conception.
Panamanians: Virgen de la Antigua.
Paraguayans: Our Lady of Caacupé.
Peruvians: Lord of Miracles.
Puerto Ricans: St. John the Baptist.
 Salvadorans: Our Lady of Peace.
Uruguayans: Virgin of the Thirty-Three.
Venezuelans: Our Lady of Coromoto.

Oceania 
Australians: Mary MacKillop, Our Lady Help of Christians

References

See also
Patron saints of places

Patron saints
Traditions by ethnic group
Lists of saints
Ethnicity